Two by Twos is one of the names used to denote an international, home-based new religious movement that has its origins in Ireland at the end of the 19th century. Among members, the church is typically referred to as "The Truth" or "The Way". Those outside the church refer to it as "Two by Twos", "The Black Stockings", "No-name Church", "Cooneyites", "Workers and Friends" or "Christians Anonymous."  Church ministers are itinerant and work in groups of two, hence the name "Two by Twos". The church's registered names include "Christian Conventions" in the United States, "Assemblies of Christians" in Canada, "The Testimony of Jesus" in the United Kingdom, "Kristna i Sverige" in Sweden, and "United Christian Conventions" in Australia.  These organization names are used only for registration purposes and are not used by members.

The church was founded in 1897 in Ireland by William Irvine, an evangelist with the interdenominational Faith Mission.  Irvine began independently preaching a return to the method of itinerant ministry he claimed was set forth in Matthew 10. Church growth was rapid, spreading outside Ireland. Irvine eventually began preaching a new order in which the hierarchy that had developed within the church would have no placement. This teaching became controversial within the church and led to his expulsion by church overseers around 1914. One of the church's most prominent evangelists, Edward Cooney, was expelled a decade after Irvine. The church then became much less visible to outsiders for the next half-century. Publication of several articles and books, increased news coverage, and the appearance of the Internet have since opened the church to wider scrutiny.

The church does not explicitly publish any doctrinal statements, claiming these must be orally imparted by its ministers, referred to as "workers". Doctrine of the church teaches that salvation is available only by accepting the preaching of its homeless, unsalaried ministry workers and by attending the group's home meetings. The orthodox Christian Trinitarian doctrine is rejected, and members deny having a church name. Baptism by immersion as performed by one of the church's workers is required for full participation. Some in the church claim it is a direct continuation of the 1st-century Christian church. Others in the church believe that a restoration of some sort may have occurred in the late 19th century.

Members hold regular weekly worship gatherings in local homes on Sunday and midweek. The church also holds annual regional conventions and public Gospel meetings. The church claims no official headquarters or official publications. Its hymnbook and various other materials for internal use are produced by outside publishers and printing firms. Printed invitations and advertisements for its open gospel meetings are the only written materials which those outside the church are likely to encounter.

History

Founding 
In 1896, William Irvine was sent from Scotland to southern Ireland as a missionary by John George Govan's Faith Mission, an interdenominational organization with roots in the Holiness movement. Because his mission was successful, he was promoted to superintendent of Faith Mission in southern Ireland.

Within a few months of his arrival in Ireland, Irvine was already disillusioned with the Faith Mission. There was friction over its Holiness teachings, and Irvine saw its organization as a violation of his concept of a faith-based ministry. Above all, Irvine was increasingly intolerant of the Faith Mission's cooperation with the other churches and clergy in the various communities of southern Ireland, regarding converts who joined churches as "lost among the clergy". In 1897, he began preaching independently, proclaiming that true ministers must have no home and take no salary. He became convinced that he had received this as a special revelation he referred to as his "Alpha message". Opposed to all other established churches, he held that the manner in which the disciples had been sent out in chapter 10 of the Gospel of Matthew was a permanent commandment which must still be observed. The passage reads in part:

In October 1897, Irvine was invited by Nenagh businessman John "Jack" Carroll to preach in the Carrolls' hometown of Rathmolyon.  There he held a series of mission meetings in which all established churches were rejected, and Irvine's new doctrine and method of ministry were set forth. It was in Rathmolyon that he recruited the first adherents to his new message. Aside from condemning all other churches, Irvine's doctrine included the rejection of church buildings, damnation of all followers of churches outside the new fellowship, rejection of paid ministry, rejection of collections during services and collection boxes, and the requirement that those seeking to join the ministry "sell all".

Irvine's preaching during this latest mission influenced others who began to leave their respective churches and join Irvine to form an initial core of followers. Some of these early adherents would become important members of the new church, including John Long, the Carroll family, John Kelly, Edward Cooney—an influential evangelist from the Church of Ireland—and George Walker (an employee of the Cooney family's fabric business), all of whom eventually "sold all" and joined the new movement as itinerant preachers. Although other movements, such as the Plymouth Brethren and Elim have had strong Irish connections, the church founded by Irvine is the only religion known to have had its origin and early development in Ireland.

Early growth 

Unlike later secretiveness, initially, the church was in the public eye, with questions about it being raised in the British Parliament beginning in 1900.
Inspired by speakers such as Irvine and Cooney, membership growth was rapid. Rather than adding members to established denominations, as was the practice of the Faith Mission outreach, churches began noticing their congregations thinning after exposure to the Two by Two missions. Clerics soon began regarding the Two by Two preachers as "inimical to the membership of the church". After receiving reports from Ireland, the Faith Mission in 1900 formally disassociated itself from Irvine and any of its workers found to be participating in the new Two by Two movement.

The attention of Belfast newspapers was initially drawn to the Two by Twos church because of its open-air baptismal rites. At that time, the baptisms took place in public settings such as streams, lakes or the sea, even in cold weather. Regarded as a novelty, the outdoor "dippings" and accompanying sermons attracted large crowds. Further attention was given during the staging of large marches through boroughs and public preaching in town squares and on street corners.

Workers, including Edward Cooney and George Walker, publicly preached that all members of other churches were damned. They singled out prominent individuals, and even entire communities, for condemnation. At times, missions were sited close to the meeting places of other denominations, which were denounced using "extreme language". Consequences of these inflammatory remarks ranged from heckling and street violence to the break-up of families, all of which brought further attention to the church. Newspapers in Ireland, Britain and North America followed the disturbances that arose over the church's activities and message. Some hosted debates in their editorial columns. One member of Parliament offered to join the Two by Twos if they would cease criticizing other religious bodies.

As the ranks of its ministry increased, the church's outreach expanded. Large gatherings were held in Dublin, Glasgow and Belfast during 1899. Annual conventions, modeled after the evangelical Keswick Conventions in England, began to be held regularly in Ireland starting in 1903. Later that year, William Irvine, accompanied by Irvine Weir and George Walker, took his message to North America. Missions to continental Europe, Australia and Asia followed.

By 1904, the requirement to "sell all" was no longer mentioned in sermons. A two-tiered system was instituted that made a distinction between homeless itinerant missionaries (called "workers") and those who were now allowed to retain homes and jobs (called "friends" or "saints"). Weekly home meetings began to be held and presided over by "elders", who were typically the householder. During the next few years, this change became universal. The church continued to grow rapidly and held regular annual conventions lasting several weeks at a time. Irvine traveled widely during this period, attending conventions and preaching worldwide, and began sending workers from the British Isles to follow up and expand interest in various areas.

Beginning in 1906, unwelcome attention came in the form of leaflets and billboard notices. W. D. Wilson, an English farmer whose unmarried children had left home and joined the Two by Twos, began publishing articles stating girls were being recruited by the church for immoral purposes. In response, Edward Cooney brought a widely publicized suit for libel that was resolved by a settlement between the parties by the end of 1913.

A hierarchy was instituted by Irvine, and his most trusted associates in various regions were designated as "overseers" or "head workers". Each worker was assigned a particular geographical sphere and then coordinated the efforts of the ministry within his area. Among the overseers were William and Jack Carroll, George Walker and Willie Gill. Irvine continued to have the ultimate say over worker conduct and finances, and his activities within their fields became regarded as "interference". Except for such annual conventions as he was able to attend across the globe, communications and instructions from Irvine passed through the overseers.

Schism 
William Irvine's progressive revelation continued to evolve over this time, and eschatological themes began to appear in sermons. By 1914, he had begun to preach that the Age of Grace, during which his "Alpha Gospel" had been proclaimed, was coming to a close. As his message turned towards indicating a new era, which held no place for the ministry and hierarchy that had rapidly grown up around the "Alpha Gospel", resentment arose on the part of overseers who saw him as a threat to their positions.

Australian overseer John Hardie was the first to break with Irvine and excluded him from speaking at the South Australia convention in late 1913. As 1914 progressed, he was excluded from speaking in a growing number of regions, as more overseers broke away from him. Rumors circulated about Irvine's comfortable lifestyle and supposed weakness for women, though nothing concrete was ever exposed. It was put about that Irvine "had lost the Lord's anointing" in an effort to explain his ouster. He was shunned and his name was no longer mentioned, making him a nonperson in the church he founded. There were many excommunications of Irvine loyalists in various fields during the following years, and by 1919, the split was final, with Irvine moving to Jerusalem and transmitting his "Omega Message" to his core followers from there. Lacking any organizational means of making his case before the membership, Irvine's ouster occurred quietly. Most members continued following the overseers, and few outside the leadership knew the details behind Irvine's disappearance from the scene, as no public mention of the split seems to have been made. Mention of Irvine's name was forbidden, and a new explanation of the group's history was introduced from which Irvine's role was erased.

Although the threat posed by Irvine to the church's organization had been dealt with, the prominent worker Edward Cooney refused to place his evangelistic efforts under the control of the overseers. Cooney himself adhered to the earlier, unfettered style of itinerant ministry, moving about wherever he felt he was needed. He rejected the appointment of head workers to geographic regions and criticized their lifestyles. He also preached against the "Living Witness" doctrine (i.e., that salvation entails hearing the gospel preached directly by a worker and seeing the gospel made alive in the sacrificial lives of the ministry), the bank accounts controlled by the overseers, use of halls for meetings, conventions, the hierarchy that had developed and the ministry and the registrations under official names. For a time, his message urging a return to the original principles of Matthew 10 gained a following, even among some Australian overseers.

A second division occurred in 1928 when Edward Cooney was expelled for criticizing the hierarchy and other elements that had arisen within the church, which he saw as serious deviations from the church's original message. The overseers seized upon a failed attempt at performing a faith healing as a pretext to excommunicate him. Cooney's loyal supporters joined him, including some of the early workers, and they stayed faithful to what they perceived to be the original tenets. The term "Cooneyite" today chiefly refers to the group which separated (or were excommunicated) along with Cooney and who continue as an independent group. Prior to the schism, onlookers had labeled the entire movement as "Cooneyites" due to Edward Cooney's prominence in the early growth of the church. There are areas where this older usage continues.

Consolidation 
These schisms were not widely publicized, and few were aware that they had occurred. Most supporters of Irvine, and later Cooney, were either coaxed into abandoning those loyalties or put out of the fellowship. Among these were the early workers May Carroll, Irvine Weir (one of the first workers in North America, who was excommunicated for continued contact with Cooney and for his objection to registration of the church under names) and Tom Elliot (who had conducted baptisms of the first workers and was nicknamed "Tom the Baptist").

The emergence of the Two by Twos caused severe splits within local Protestant churches in Ireland at a time of increasing demands for Irish independence, largely driven by the Catholic majority community. Because of animosity, the Two by Twos did not form a united front with other Protestant communities. Although the church was noted for extreme anti-Catholic views, it played a very minor role during the struggle for Irish independence. One exception was the involvement of the Pearson family in the still-controversial Coolacrease incident.

In the mid-1920s, a magazine article entitled "The Cooneyites or Go-Preachers" disturbed the leadership, who made efforts to have it withdrawn, particularly when material from the article was added to the widely distributed reference Heresies Exposed. During this period, the church modified its evangelical outreach. The public preaching of its early days was replaced with low-key "gospel meetings", which were attended only by members and invitees. The church began to assert that it had a 1st-century origin. It asserted that it had no organization or name and disclaimed any unique doctrines. The church shunned publicity, making the church very difficult for outsiders to follow.

The North American church saw a struggle for influence between overseers George Walker in the east and Jack Carroll. In 1928, an agreement was forged between the senior overseers that limited workers operating outside of their appointed geographical spheres, known as "fields": workers traveling into an area controlled by another overseer had to first submit their revelation to, and obtain permission from, the local overseer.  The exact boundaries between fields was worked out over time, and there were areas where workers under the control of more than one overseer operated, causing conflict.

During the First World War, the church obtained exemption from military service in Britain under the name "The Testimony of Jesus". However, there were problems with recognition of this name outside the British Isles, and exemption was refused in many other areas. In New Zealand during World War I, members of the church could not prove their conscientious objector status, and formed the largest segment of those imprisoned for refusal to serve. Members and ministers also had difficulty establishing their conscientious objector status in the United States during the First World War. With the start of the Second World War, formal names were adopted and used in registering the church with various national governments. These names continued to be used for official business, and stationery bearing those names was printed for the use of overseers. Most members were not aware of these names. Some who dissented after learning of the practice were expelled by the workers.

After the death of Australian overseer William Carroll in 1953, an attempt was made to reintegrate the repudiated adherents of William Irvine and Edward Cooney. Rather than producing further unity, the attempt produced conflicts over the church's history which was exposed, the existence of legal names, disagreements over the hierarchy which had developed and other controversies. Many excommunications took place in the subsequent effort to enforce harmony.

The earliest workers and overseers were succeeded by a new generation of leaders. In Europe, William Irvine died in 1947, Edward Cooney died in 1960, and John Long (expelled in 1907) died in 1962. British overseer Willie Gill died in 1951. In the South Pacific, New Zealand overseer Wilson McClung died in 1944, and Australian overseer John Hardie died in 1961. In North America, both Jack Carroll, the Western overseer, and Irvine Weir died in 1957 while Eastern overseer George Walker died in 1981.

Its policy of not revealing its name, finances, doctrine or history, and avoidance of publicity largely kept the church from public notice. A few authors of popular literature have noted the church, even using it as background for various works.

Into the 21st century 
Divisions, both doctrinal and organizational, within the group have formed throughout its history and continue as ongoing challenges.

Until the mid 1980s, notes regarding the Two by Twos had appeared infrequently in religious journals and sociological works, with some writers assuming that the church had greatly declined, with nothing published regarding it. In 1982, the publication of The Secret Sect was followed by press reports and public statements by former members. Other books and news coverage dealing with the sect appeared in the following decades and increased awareness of the church and its practices. With the exposure of regional differences and the appearance of dissent, a loosening of a few strict standards demanded of members has been observed in some areas. A marked decline in membership has occurred over recent decades, coinciding with availability of information on the Internet and elsewhere.

Doctrine 
Apart from their hymnals, officially published documentation or statements from the church are scarce, which makes it difficult to speak in depth about its beliefs. Some former members and critics of the church have made statements about its beliefs, although these points have rarely been publicly responded to by any authorities within the church.

All the church's teachings are expressed orally, and the church does not publish doctrine or statements of faith. Workers hold that all church teachings are based solely on the Bible. A catchphrase frequently used to describe the church is: "The church in the home, and the ministry without a home". Church members and 'workers' will publicly declare that the church does not own any buildings. This is not strictly true: in fact, church members own rural or semi-rural properties on which convention meetings are held and these properties incorporate buildings that are dedicated to worship, housing workers, and church gatherings including conventions and 'special meetings'. The concept of church buildings is still seen as inconsistent with biblical Christianity and was strongly denounced by early workers. Its ministers do not own homes or draw a salary. The church has upheld these practices since its inception. Notwithstanding this tradition, buildings specially constructed or repurposed for the use of the church do exist, including convention buildings, meeting halls, tents, caravans, and portable halls. Rural properties are largely held and maintained on behalf of the church by certain members, however in recent years, a Northern Irish investment vehicle has been used to purchase English convention property. A dedicated church building was constructed in Canada early on, but eventually was rejected by Irvine.

The King James Bible is the only book used in English language services. The Bible itself is held as insufficient for salvation unless its words be made "alive" through preaching of its ministers.
The extemporaneous preaching of the ministry is considered to be guided by God and must be heard directly. Great weight is given to the thoughts of workers, especially more senior workers. Salvation is achieved through willingness to uphold the church's standards, by faithfully following in "the way", and by personal worthiness. Doctrines such as predestination, original sin, justification by faith alone, and redemption as the sole basis of salvation are rejected. The church is exclusive — all other churches, religions and ministries are held to be false and salvation is only obtainable through the Two by Two ministry and meetings.

Salvation is deemed to require self-sacrifice in following the example and commandments of Jesus and suffering is revered. Members are encouraged to attend meetings and to speak at them. Although the church has roots in the Holiness movement and has inherited some of its features, charismatic elements are suppressed. Other standards include modest dress, not wearing jewelry, long hair for women and short hair for men, not getting piercings, not dying hair, not getting a tattoo, and avoiding activities deemed to be worldly or frivolous (such as smoking, drinking alcohol, watching television, and viewing motion pictures). Standards and practices vary geographically: for example, in some areas fermented wine is used in Sunday meetings, in other areas grape juice is used; in some areas people who have divorced and remarried are not allowed to participate in meetings, in others they may. The use of television, social media sites and other mass media is discouraged in some areas, based on the stance of the local workers and overseers. Some external standards in dress and conduct have been loosened in recent years in response to criticisms.

Christology 
The church has rejected the doctrine of the Trinity since its inception. Though members believe in the Father, Son, and Holy Spirit, they hold a unitarian view of Christ. The Holy Spirit is held as an attitude or force from God. Jesus is God's son, a fully human figure who came to earth to establish a way of ministry and salvation, but not God himself. Great stress is laid upon the "example life" of Jesus, as a pattern for the ministry.

Baptism 
Baptism by one of the church's ministers is considered a necessary step for salvation and full participation, including re-baptism of persons baptized by other churches. Candidates approved by the local workers are baptized by immersion.

Church name 

The church represents itself as nondenominational and without a name. Those outside the church often use descriptive terms such as "Two by Twos" (from their method of sending out ministers in pairs), "No-name Church", "Cooneyites", "Workers and Friends", "Christian fellowship", "disciples of Jesus", "Friends", "Go-preachers", "People on the Way", "Tramp Preachers", among other titles. The new movement was originally called "Tramp Preachers" or "Tramp Pilgrims" by observers. During the early years, they called themselves by the name "Go-Preachers". By 1904, the terms "Cooneyism" and "Cooneyite" had been coined in those areas in which Edward Cooney established churches and where he was a vocal promoter. The term "Two by Twos" was in use in Canada by the early 1920s and in the United States by the 1930s. In Germany, bynames for the church have included "Die Namenlosen" (the Nameless), "Wahre Christen" (True Christians), "Jünger Jesu" (Disciples of Jesus) and "Freunde" (Friends). In France, they have been known as "Les Anonymes" (the Anonymous, or No-names).

Though overseers and head workers use registered names when necessary to conduct official business, most members do not associate a formal name with the church. Instead, they refer to the church as "The Truth", "The Way", "The Jesus Way" or "The Lowly Way". Few members are aware that the church has taken official names used for church business, including seeking military exemptions. Registered names vary from nation to nation. In the United States, the name used is "Christian Conventions", in Canada "Assemblies of Christians" is used, in Britain it is "the Testimony of Jesus", in Sweden the registered name is "Kristna I Sverige", and "United Christian Conventions" has been used in Australia and other nations (Australian members previously adopted the name "Testimony of Jesus" during World War I, and registered as "Christian Assemblies" during World War II). The sect was also incorporated in Victoria Australia as a charity from 1929 until 2019 and held property in trust. Australia also  In 1995, controversy arose in Alberta, Canada, when part of the church incorporated as the "Alberta Society of Christian Assemblies". The entity was dissolved in 1996 after its existence became generally known.

Restorationism 
Many church members hold to a long-standing view that the church has no earthly founder, and that only they represent the "true Christian Church", originating directly with Christ during the 1st century AD. Some members have more recently made statements which diverge from that view and hint either at a beginning during the closing years of the 19th century or at a notable resurgence or restoration around that time.

Terminology 
The following are terms used by the church with the definitions giving the sense commonly intended and understood by members.

 
 generally, a small, local congregation that meets in a home; can refer to a larger group of believers or to the church as a whole. This term is never used to refer to a building, except when referring to church buildings of other denominations, or occasionally when speaking metaphorically. Used colloquially when talking to strangers to refer to Sunday/Wednesday activity, e.g., "I'll be at church until midday."
 
 formal religious gatherings.
 
 a geographical region to which workers have been assigned (similar to parishes).
 
 a series of larger meetings known as gospel meetings the function of which is proselytizing. Generally a sequence of such gospel meetings will conclude with a day during which—as a hymn is sung—those interested may rise to their feet and thereby profess their willingness to follow the teachings of the church (or "the way").
 
 adherent or member, the laity. Collectively "the friends," or "the saints."
 
 to make a public declaration of one's willingness to become a member, which is generally a sign that a person may then participate in the prayer and testimony sections of Wednesday night and Sunday morning meetings or at designated testimony times in larger gatherings. Professing constitutes an intermediate stage. Following baptism, the partaking of bread and grape juice (or wine) is also permitted, which in some fields occurs between the elder's testimony and the final hymn.
 
 a chairman of a local meeting. Normally the male head of the house in which meetings are held. The bishop/elder is usually the person in charge of calling the start of the meeting. When a worker is present, he or she will generally initiate and direct the gathering instead. The deacon is considered to be an alternate to the elder in some areas.
 
 terms used to denote the church's semi-itinerant, homeless ministers. These are unmarried (several exceptions were made during the first half of the 20th century to allow married couples to enter the ministry), and do not have any formal training. Workers go out in same-sex pairs (hence the term "Two by Two"), consisting of a more experienced worker with a junior companion.
 
 the senior worker in charge of a geographic area, roughly corresponding to the position of a bishop in Catholicism. There is no hierarchical position higher than overseer—such as a pope—which might guarantee doctrinal and practical unanimity.
 
 any person who has not 'professed' in accordance with the church's processes and is therefore deemed to be 'outside' of God's fold.
 
 a broad term used to describe all people not involved in the church including those in other religions.

Practice and structure

Ministry 
The church holds that faith and salvation may only be obtained by hearing the preaching of its ministers (typically called workers), and by observing their sacrificial lives. During the early years, this requirement was referred to as the "Living Witness Doctrine," though that term is no longer used. The minister must be heard and observed in person, rather than by broadcasts, recordings, books or tracts, or other indirect communication. The church's ministerial structure is based on Jesus' instructions to his apostles found in Matthew Chapter 10, verses 8–16 (with similar passages in Mark and in Luke). The church's view is that, following these Biblical examples, its ministers have no permanent dwelling places, minister in pairs, sell all and go out with only minimal worldly possessions, and rely only upon hospitality and generosity. Most ministers receive their support and income directly from lay members, and have no fixed address except for mail collection.

The option of entering the ministry is theoretically open to every baptized member, although it has been many decades since married people were accepted into the ministry. Female workers operate in the same manner as male workers. However, they cannot rise to the position of overseer, do not lead meetings when a male worker is present, and occupy a lower rank than male workers.

Workers do not engage in any formal religious training. Overseers pair new workers with senior companions until they are deemed ready to move beyond a junior position. The workers are assigned new companions annually. Workers organize and assign members to the home meetings, appoint elders, and decide controversies among members. Workers are not registered marriage celebrants, so members are married by secular functionaries (such as a justice of the peace). However, workers will give sermons and prayers at members' weddings if requested, and they officiate at the funerals of members.

In April 2019 the Australian current affairs television show 60 Minutes interviewed child sex abuse victims of Australian ministers.

Gatherings 
The church holds several types of gatherings throughout the year in various locations.

 
 A Gospel meeting is the gathering that is most likely to be open to those considered to be "outsiders". At one time, Gospel meetings were typically held in tents, set up by workers as they traveled; they are now most commonly held in a rented space. Gospel meetings are held to attract new members, though professing members typically make up the majority of attendees. The Gospel meeting consists of a period of quiet, followed by congregational singing (often accompanied by piano) of selected hymns, and then sermons delivered by the church's workers. Gospel meetings are regularly scheduled for portions of the year in areas where the group is well-established. They may also be held when a worker believes there may be people in the region who would be receptive to the church's message.
 
 Participation in this closed meeting is generally restricted to members. It is usually held in the home of an elder, and consists of a cappella singing from the regular hymnal, partaking of communion emblems (a piece of leavened bread and a cup of wine or grape juice), prayer and sharing of testimonies by members in good standing.
 
 Participation in this closed meeting is generally restricted to members, and is usually held in the home of an elder each Wednesday evening. Members are assigned a list of Bible verses or a topic of study for consideration during the week, for discussion at the next meeting. As the meeting progresses, each member shares thoughts regarding the scripture or topic. Thoughts are shared by individual members in turn, and members do not engage in discussions during the meeting. The Bible study meeting includes hymns and prayers.
 
 This is a monthly gathering of several congregations, and follows the format of the Sunday morning meetings. Union meetings are not open to the public.

 Special meetings are annual gatherings of members from a large area. Each is held as a private gathering, often in a rented hall. Special meetings last a single day, and include sermons by local and visiting workers. The sermons are interspersed with prayers, hymns, and testimonies.
 
 These annual events are attended by members from within a larger geographical area than for the special meetings. Conventions are held over several days, usually in rural areas on properties with facilities to handle housing, feeding, and other necessities for those who attend. These services generally follow the format used for special meetings. Conventions are not open to the public, although outsiders often attend by invitation. Although not now usual, members were at one time segregated by sex during services.
 
 These gatherings are not open to either the public or general membership. Attendance and participation are restricted to workers and certain invited members. The meeting may be a regular Bible study, or it may be used to disseminate any instructions from senior workers or to issue decisions about controversial matters. They are held during conventions, or as necessary. These meetings include prayer, a period for testimonies from any workers wishing to share, and may include statements by senior workers in attendance.

Organisation 
Members claim the church does not have a formal organization. Members do not participate in, and many are unaware of, the church's governance. Although in the early years of the church, a headquarters was maintained in Belfast, no official headquarters currently exist and the church remains largely unincorporated. Both expenditures and funds collected remain secret from the membership and no accounting is made public. Funds are handled through stewardships, trusts, and cash transactions.

No materials are published by the church for outside circulation other than invitations to open Gospel meetings. Printed materials are published for circulation among the members and include sermon notes, convention notes, Bible study lists, convention lists, and worker lists. In recent years, contact details of members, including phone numbers and home addresses, have been compiled into booklets.  These booklets are very secretive and available for workers' use only.  Some members of the group refuse to provide their details for these booklets, in the name of privacy. Some members of the group see the internal dissemination of worker letters as continuing the practice of the early Church and the epistolary work of the original apostles.

Hierarchy 
The church is controlled by a small group of senior male overseers with each having oversight of a specific geographic region. Under each senior overseer are male head workers who have oversight of a single state, province or similar area, depending on the country. These head workers handle the two-by-two pairing and field assignments of workers for that area. Each pair of workers has charge over several local meetings with the senior worker of the two having authority over his junior. Local meetings are hosted in the homes of elders who report to the workers. Correspondence such as reporting, finances, and instructions are often communicated according to the set hierarchy. The administration of the church and its annual process of assigning of workers to fields are rarely discussed among the membership.

Hymnals 
The church's first hymnal, The Go-Preacher's Hymn Book, had been compiled by 1909, and contained 125 hymns. The English-language hymn book currently used is Hymns Old and New and was first published in 1913 with several subsequent editions and translations.  It contains 412 hymns, many of which were written or adapted by workers and other members of the church and is organized into "gospel" and "fellowship" hymns. A smaller, second hymnal, also titled Hymns Old and New, consists of the first 170 songs found in the full hymnal.  Another version of the hymn book contains words without musical notation and is used primarily by children and those who cannot read music. Hymn books in other languages, such as "Himnos" in Spanish, contain many hymns translated from English and sung to the same tunes, as well as original non-English hymns.

Endnotes

Footnotes

References

Books

Journals, newspapers, periodicals, television

Papers and theses

Websites 

 
 
 
 
 
 
 
 
 
 

Christian new religious movements
Nontrinitarian denominations
Protestant denominations established in the 19th century
Religious organizations established in 1897
Restorationism (Christianity)